St. Anthony's Senior Secondary School may refer to several schools in India:
 St. Anthony's Senior Secondary School, Barabanki
 St. Anthony's Senior Secondary School, Udaipur
 St. Anthony’s Higher Secondary School, Shillong